GeoReader is a landmark locating software application and website for mobile iPhone and Android based devices. Users travel into the vicinity of a “talking point”, and the software enables the phone to read text aloud that is linked with a GPS location.  In addition, users can create their own 200 character count text to add to the database, and choose to share these talking points publicly or privately. The system is hands  free and requires no physical interaction. Once the app is installed in the mobile device, the user simply opens the app and starts their trip. The application automatically then starts to search for any GPS tagged talking points within range of the user.

Features
GeoReader had over 120,000 talking points loaded into the database at launch. It is linked to one of the largest databases of historical marker text and their GPS coordinates in the United States. The application database contains a high percentage of markers for states such as Texas, Virginia, Georgia, Oregon and Michigan. It includes Pennsylvania's entire historical roadside marker collection and other points of interest in the rest of the US and Canada. Using crowd sourcing, the GeoReader database is intended to grow with user input, and is marketed free for this purpose. User created topics are not limited to only landmarks, but could be of any interesting fact, famous past event or point of interest associated with a location. One can view the number of times their talking points has been read by exporting a comma-separated-values (CSV) file for analysis. Talking points can also be created or changed using Google Maps on the website, www.mygeoreader.com.

Talking points created with the intention of advertising a business or service are charged a fee. Advertisement is location specific, and users will only hear short advertising points when they are physically near the GPS coordinates of the talking point, for example, a retail location or an approaching exit on a highway. This type of targeted advertising ensures that the recipient of the information is at a precise location when the message is heard.

GeoReader can be customized.  It allows a user to increase or decrease the range of the talking point search. Shorter ranges are recommended when walking or biking. Longer ranges work well when traveling quickly past landmarks, such as on a highway. GeoReader is currently available only on Android OS, and works anywhere in the world.

GeoReader was created by David Moreau of Fayetteville, New York, and was launched on the Android Market in September 2010 and the iPhone market in June 2012. It was a 2010 SMAATO Mobile Advertising Awards Nominee, and a finalist in the 2010 European Satellite Navigation Competition. It is consistently selected as a top application in its field of interest (travel, entertainment, social location).

See also

References

External links 
 GeoReader website http://www.mygeoreader.com 

Android (operating system) software
IOS software
Geosocial networking